Miss Liselott is a 1934 German comedy film directed by Johannes Guter and starring Magda Schneider, Albert Lieven, and Maria Sazarina. The former silent director Franz Hofer worked as assistant director on the film.

The film's sets were designed by the art director Erich Czerwonski.

Cast

References

Bibliography

External links 
 

1934 films
1934 comedy films
Films of Nazi Germany
German comedy films
1930s German-language films
Films directed by Johannes Guter
German black-and-white films
1930s German films